Inarticulate Speech of the Heart is the fourteenth studio album by Northern Irish singer-songwriter Van Morrison, released in 1983. Morrison said he arrived at the title from a Shavian saying: "that idea of communicating with as little articulation as possible, at the same time being emotionally articulate". As his last album for Warner Bros. Records, he decided to do an album which had more than the usual complement of instrumental tracks. As he explained in 1984, "Sometimes when I'm playing something, I'm just sort of humming along with it, and that's got a different vibration than an actual song.  So the instrumentals just come from trying to get that form of expression, which is not the same as writing a song." Although not expanded upon, of note is that a special thanks is given to L. Ron Hubbard in the liner notes. The reissued and remastered version of the album contains alternative takes of "Cry for Home" and "Inarticulate Speech of the Heart No. 2".

Recording
The recording sessions took place in California, Dublin, and a series of marathon sessions at the Town House in London.  Morrison played piano, guitar and saxophone on these sessions.
Two Irish musicians played on the album (Arty McGlynn and Davy Spillane) and overall the music had a strong Celtic colouring.  Four of the songs were instrumentals.

Critical reception

The Chicago Sun Times gave the album an honourable mention in their list of the top ten albums of 1983.

Track listing

Personnel
 Van Morrison – guitar, piano, Fender Rhodes, alto saxophone, vocals
 David Hayes – bass guitar
 Mark Isham – synthesizer, trumpet
 John Allair – Hammond organ, piano, Fender Rhodes
 Pee Wee Ellis – tenor saxophone, soprano saxophone, flute
 Tom Donlinger – percussion, drums
 Mihr Un Nisa Douglass – backing vocals
 Stephanie Douglass – backing vocals
 Pauline Lozana – backing vocals
 Arty McGlynn – acoustic guitar
 Davy Spillane – Uilleann pipes, alto flute
 Chris Michie – guitar
 Annie Stocking – backing vocals
 Bianca Thornton – backing vocals
 Peter Van Hooke – drums, tambourine

Charts

Weekly charts

Year-end charts

Certifications

References

Citations

Sources

External links

Van Morrison albums
1983 albums
Albums produced by Van Morrison
Mercury Records albums
Warner Records albums
Polydor Records albums